As of 2020, no operational high-speed rail systems exist in Kazakhstan. Two links are planned – between Almaty and Astana, and an international link between Moscow and Beijing that would go through the country.

Astana–Almaty
In November 2013 the proposed Astana (then Nur-Sultan)–Almaty high speed railway was postponed due to high costs and doubts over passenger numbers.

Previously in March 2013, Qazaqstan Temir Zholy, the national rail company of Kazakhstan, awarded a contract to Systra to oversee the design and construction of a high-speed line from Astana, the country's capital, to Almaty, its largest city. A  viaduct across Lake Balkhash is planned near Sayaq. The system will use Russian gauge, the same as used by Kazakhstan's existing conventional lines.

Moscow–Beijing via Kazakhstan
In 2015, a Russian Railways official said that the Moscow-Beijing HSR line would pass through either Russia's Altai Republic or Kazakhstan. The difference in length between the two proposed routes would be 290 km (180 miles).

Tashkent-Turkistan 
In 2021, the Kazakh Prime Minister Asqar Mamin announced plans to extend the high-speed rail line terminating in Tashkent, Uzbekistan across the border to Shymkent and Turkistan.

References

Kazakhstan